Whittingham, also known as Greenbriar at Whittingham, is an unincorporated community and census-designated place (CDP) located within Monroe Township, in Middlesex County, New Jersey, United States. As of the 2010 United States Census, the CDP's population was 2,476. The area is focused around the age-restricted gated community of Whittingham.

Geography
According to the United States Census Bureau, the CDP had a total area of 1.003 square miles (2.598 km2), including 0.997 square miles (2.582 km2) of land and 0.006 square miles (0.016 km2) of water (0.60%).

Demographics

Census 2010

Census 2000
As of the 2000 United States Census there were 2,483 people, 1,339 households, and 1,033 families living in the CDP. The population density was 949.2/km2 (2,462.4/mi2). There were 1,414 housing units at an average density of 540.5/km2 (1,402.3/mi2). The racial makeup of the CDP was 98.59% White, 0.56% African American, 0.04% Native American, 0.48% Asian, 0.24% from other races, and 0.08% from two or more races. Hispanic or Latino of any race were 0.64% of the population.

There were 1,339 households, out of which 0.7% had children under the age of 18 living with them, 75.7% were married couples living together, 1.2% had a female householder with no husband present, and 22.8% were non-families. 20.5% of all households were made up of individuals, and 16.9% had someone living alone who was 65 years of age or older. The average household size was 1.85 and the average family size was 2.07.

In the CDP the population was spread out, with 0.8% under the age of 18, 0.3% from 18 to 24, 1.9% from 25 to 44, 25.7% from 45 to 64, and 71.3% who were 65 years of age or older. The median age was 69 years. For every 100 females, there were 84.7 males. For every 100 females age 18 and over, there were 84.0 males.

The median income for a household in the CDP was $57,273, and the median income for a family was $66,346. Males had a median income of $70,556 versus $35,833 for females. The per capita income for the CDP was $40,447. About 1.3% of families and 2.3% of the population were below the poverty line, including none of those under age 18 and 1.6% of those age 65 or over.

References

Census-designated places in Middlesex County, New Jersey
Monroe Township, Middlesex County, New Jersey